In Greek mythology, Thyia (Thuia derived from the verb θύω "to sacrifice") was a female figure associated with cults of several major gods.

Mythology 
In the Delphic tradition, Thyia was also the naiad of a spring on Mount Parnassos in Phocis (central Greece), daughter of the river god Cephissus. Her shrine was the site for the gathering of the Thyiades (women who celebrated in the orgies= ancient religious ceremony of the god Dionysos). She was said to have been the first to sacrifice to Dionysus, and to celebrate orgies in his honour. Hence, the Attic women, who every year went to Mount Parnassus to celebrate the Dionysiac orgies with the Delphian Thyiades, received themselves the name of Thyades or Thyiades (synonymous with Maenads).

She was said to have loved Apollo and bore him a son, Delphos, the eponymous founder of town Delphi, beside the oracular shrine. She was also closely associated with the prophetic Castalian Spring, from which she was sometimes said to have been born (Pausanias follows a tradition that made her daughter of the autochthon Castalius). Thyia was also related to Castalia, the nymph of the spring; Melaena, an alternative mother for Delphos; and the Corycian nymphs, Naiades of the springs of the holy Corycian Cave.

Thyia was also reported to have had an affair with Poseidon, and to have been a close friend of Chloris, wife of Neleus, son of Poseidon.

A sacred precinct of Thyia was reported to have been located in the city of the same name, with an altar to the Anemoi set up during the Greco-Persian Wars.

The name was applied to the white cedar and its genus,  Thuja, by Linnaeus (1753).

Notes

References 

 Herodotus, The Histories with an English translation by A. D. Godley. Cambridge. Harvard University Press. 1920. Online version at the Topos Text Project. Greek text available at Perseus Digital Library.
 Pausanias, Description of Greece with an English Translation by W.H.S. Jones, Litt.D., and H.A. Ormerod, M.A., in 4 Volumes. Cambridge, MA, Harvard University Press; London, William Heinemann Ltd. 1918. . Online version at the Perseus Digital Library
Pausanias, Graeciae Descriptio. 3 vols. Leipzig, Teubner. 1903.  Greek text available at the Perseus Digital Library.

Naiads
Nymphs
Mortal women of Zeus
Women of Apollo
Phocian characters in Greek mythology
Mythology of Macedonia (ancient kingdom)
Mythology of Phocis
Dionysus in mythology
Cult of Dionysus
Ancient Greek religion